Carlos Moyá defeated Lleyton Hewitt in the final, 7–5, 7–6(7–5) to win the singles tennis title at the 2002 Cincinnati Masters.

Gustavo Kuerten was the defending champion, but lost in the first round to Tim Henman.

Seeds

Draw

Finals

Top half

Section 1

Section 2

Bottom half

Section 3

Section 4

Qualifying

Qualifying seeds

Qualifiers

Qualifying draw

First qualifier

Second qualifier

Third qualifier

Fourth qualifier

Fifth qualifier

Sixth qualifier

Seventh qualifier

Eighth qualifier

References

External links
 ITF tournament profile
 Main draw (ATP)
 Qualifying draw (ATP)

2002 Western & Southern Financial Group Masters
Singles